Okara, a city in the province of Punjab in Pakistan has many parks. Among the best-known parks are Farid-ud-Din Water Park and Joyland, Rides and Tides, Safdar Shaheed Park (commonly called  Company Bagh), Mian Muhammad Zaman Public Park, Jinnah Park Okara, Family Park, and Ladies Park. There are also more than fifteen mini-parks in Okara.

Farid-ud-Din Water Park 

Farid-ud-Water Park and Joyland Okara is named after renowned Saint Farid-u-Din GanjShakar (R.A). It is the only water park in Okara. Farid-ud-Din Water Park was established in 2014. It is located near Okara Bypass at N-5 (National Highway 5), Okara; it is a private park. Farid-u-Din Water Park consists of an area of almost 24281.1 square meters, divided into three areas: one for swimming pools, a second for amusement rides called Joyland, and a third called Play Land especially for children. There are three swimming pools in Farid-u-Din Water Park and the depth of each pool is 4.9 feet. Two are open all the time, while the third is only open for special events such as Eid-ul-Fitr, Eid-ul-Adha, Independence Day, etc. The total number of slides that lead into one of the swimming pools is eight, six slides have curves. In Joyland there are many types of amusement rides, including a swing boat, a paratrooper swing, a flying carpet swing, and an octopus swing. There is also a small train named Data Express. In Play Land there are amusements for children relating to electric cars, video games, and other activities youngsters enjoy. A small mosque also exists for saying prayers in the park. Farid-ud-Din Water Park usually opens at 11 AM and closes at 11 PM. A staff of about ten work in Farid-ud-Din park.

Safdar Shaheed 

Safdar Shaheed Park is well known as Company Bagh; it is the primary large park of Okara. Safdar Shaheed Park is Located at Tehsil Road, Okara. It was originally called Company Bagh, and was established before the partition of the subcontinent. In 1988, its name was changed to Safdar Shaheed Park after the martyr Captain Safdar Shaheed. This park is overseen by Okara's Municipal Corporation. It consists of an area of approximately 32400 square meters. In Safdar Shaheed Park there are grassy plots, water, seasonal and ornamental plants, benches, and two jogging tracks—the first is of soil and 0.8 km in length, the second is 1.5 km long and paved with Tuff Tiles. There are two fountains and three gazebos. There are three gates at Safdar Shaheed Park, two for the public and one only for Municipal Corporation Administration use while working in the park. The park is lighted at night, and has two washrooms, and three water fountains. The park has two security guards, three sanitation workers, and four gardeners to ensure the park is clean and beautiful. Safdar Shaheed Park is enclosed by a boundary wall. Safdar Shaheed Park was last renovated in 2005. It is estimated more than 3000 visitors come to the park each day, many for walking, and also on school trips. Safdar Shaheed Park is kept open 24 hours a day, for people of all ages.

Jinnah Park  

Jinnah Park is the second main park of Okara; it is located on Benazir Road along 4-L Minor at Jahaz Chowk, Okara. The total area of Jinnah Park is approximately 23466 square meters. After partition the land where Jinnah Park is located became property of the Evacuee Trust Property Board. The initial park established in the area was named Pehlwanawala Park. In 1993, Minister of Sports, Culture and Tourism Rao Sikandar Iqbal rebuilt this park for Okara's public. On 5 April 1996 Rao Sikandar Iqbal laid the Founding Stone for the park which was renamed Jinnah Park; and on 21 August 1996 then Prime Minister of Pakistan Benazir Bhutto inaugurated the park. Jinnah Park is now under the supervision of the Municipal Corporation Okara. The park is grassy, with seasonal and perennial plants, and a boundary wall. It features public benches, two washrooms, and more than ten water fountains. Jinnah Park has a central walking track of almost 0.5 km and a side jogging track of about 0.7 km. There are two gates into Jinnah Park. Two sanitation workers and two gardeners look after the park. School children frequent the park, and sometimes people also offer funeral prayers in Jinnah Park. Jinnah Park is open for the public 24 hours a day.

Mian Muhammad Zaman Public Park Okara 

Mian Muhammad Zaman Public Park is located at Akbar Road, along one side it is situated on Rao Sikandar Iqbal Road. It is adjacent to the LBDC canal and 4-L Minor Canal. It is in the neighborhood of Rides and Tides Okara. Mian Muhammad Zaman Public Park was established in 2011, it was originally named Okara Public Park and was an initiative of then District Coordination Officer Capt (r) Saif Anjum. Mian Muhammad Zaman Public Park consists of an area of almost 24281 square meters. Before becoming a park the land was Mall Mandi and used as a landfill station for Okara city waste. In 2013 former Provincial Minister of Punjab for Irrigation Mian Yawar Zaman changed its name to Mian Muhammad Zaman Public Park after his father, former state Minister Mian Muhammad Zaman. In Mian Muhammad Zaman Public Park there are grassy plots, seasonal and perennial plants, benches, and some swings. A hill in the park has two gazebos on it. The park also has a walking track, and a small mosque. One sanitation worker and a gardener take care of the park. Since it has no nighttime lighting, the park is only open during the daytime.

Rides and Tides Okara 

Rides and Tides is a family amusement park situated on Akbar Road in Okara. It was established by the Inter Gain group of companies with the support of Okara's local district government in 2013. Rides and Tides is confined to an area of almost 10117.1 square meters. It is adjacent to Mian Muhammad Zaman Park in Okara. Rides and Tides is famous for its amusement rides. Its Ferris wheel is the main attraction in Rides and Tides. Other rides include Pirate ship, Octopus, Flying Chopper,  T Cup, Baggi Ride, and Sumba Tower. In Rides and Tides there is also a small train and a play land for children. Each ride has its own small ticket house, but these are only open for events. Rides and Tides has more than ten workers. It is closed nowadays due to land issue with the government.

References 

Parks in Pakistan
Okara, Pakistan